Gordon Kyle Diez Cormier (born October 9, 2009) is a Canadian actor. He played Joe in The Stand (2020) and will portray Aang in the upcoming Netflix live-action Avatar: The Last Airbender series.

Life and career 
Cormier is of European and Filipino descent. He grew up in Vancouver, British Columbia and became interested in acting. His parents are Gordon Cormier Senior and Genalyn Cormier.

He has starred in a Canadian cartoon series. His debut role was in Get Shorty (2017), where he played Guatemalan Urchin. He also appeared in Lost in Space (2018).

His role in The Stand (2020) as Joe, a young boy who becomes the ward of Nadine Cross, brought him to mainstream attention.

In August 2021, he was cast as the titular character Aang in Avatar: The Last Airbender, a Netflix live-action remake of the animated series of the same name.

Filmography

Television

References 

Living people
Canadian male television actors
21st-century Canadian male actors
Canadian male actors of Filipino descent
Canadian male child actors
Male actors from Vancouver
Year of birth uncertain
2009 births